Swider may refer to:
 Świder, river in Masovia, Poland
 Świder, Lublin Voivodeship, village in eastern Poland
 Świder railway station in Otwock, Poland
 Swider (surname)

See also
 
 Swiderian culture
 Świdry (disambiguation)